Phymatopsis  may refer to:
 a synonym for Selliguea, a fern genus
 Leptotarsus subg. Phymatopsis, a subgenus in the crane flies genus Leptotarsus